Anton Susha (born 25 January 2000) is a Belarusian professional footballer who plays for Dinamo Minsk.

Honours
Gomel
Belarusian Cup winner: 2021–22

References

External links 
 
 
 Profile at Dinamo Minsk website

2000 births
Living people
Belarusian footballers
Association football midfielders
FC Dinamo Minsk players
FC Gomel players
FC Arsenal Dzerzhinsk players
FC Slutsk players